Dharabi is a village in the Punjab province of Pakistan. A small river name "Dharab" passes by and named after the village. The M2 motorway between Lahore and Islamabad pass over this river.

A water reservoir was constructed on this river. Dharabi Dam which is supposed to be the largest water reservoir in the district has the capacity of storing 37,000 acre feet of water but it may not serve the purpose as lands it was supposed to irrigate lie at a higher altitude. The technical issues was raised in the nascence of the project but it was not attended to and the project was completed in 2009.  The project once fully operational will bring about 6400 Acres of land water under irrigation out of which 6000 Acres through gravity flow and 400 Acres through lift (Small Dam 
Organization, 2007).

Introduction 

Dharabi is a village located in the midst of cities of Chakwal and Talagang, in Punjab, Pakistan. The village Dharabi is named after the river Dharab passing through this village, which stretches to Kallar Kahar. Its total area is 1.6 km2 (0.6 sq mi) and it is elevated at 408 m (1,339 ft).

Etymology 

Dharabi(‘Dhar’-‘aabi’) is an amalgam of two words ‘Dhar’ and ‘Aab’ which means ‘located in the middle of water. Dharabi literally means a place located in the middle of water.

Historical background 

As told by the natives of Dharabi, this village was first inhabited by Raja Hakim Khan Janjua Rajput. Hindus and sikhs also lived here before partition. The schools where the Hindu and Sikh teachers taught are still exist in Dharabi.

Neighboring areas 

The adjoining areas include Bikhari Kalan, Balkasar, Bharpur, Thoa Bahadar, Mengen, Bhoun, Jhamrah, Dharokna, Kadhar, Kalar Kahar, pindi Gheb, Dudhial, Lilla, Bhera, Alipur Syedan, Karsal, Tuti bann, Nakka kahoot and Bhalwal.

Present inhabitants 

Presently the Malik family, Rajgaan family and other casts are living in Dharabi. Malik family in this region stands out with their exceptional professional growth, most of them serve in the Armed forces.

Language 

The inhabitants of Dharabi speak ‘Punjab’ primarily for the purpose of communicating.

Population 

Dharabi is a moderate sized village where thousands of people live.

Sources of earning 

About 70 per cent of the population of Dharabi relies on agriculture, natural resources and livestock as their major sources of earning livelihood. Though many villagers lack sufficient crops production, they fulfill their insufficiency by rearing livestock.

Residence of the inhabitants 

Primitively the people of Dharabi used to live in cob houses but recently the trend has shifted. People now make well insulated-cemented houses. Other sources of income include selling firewood, grass and fodder, medicinal plants, fruits and vegetables grown by the people themselves.

Domestic Farming 

This domestic farming in the village of Dharabi includes the breeding, raising, gathering, and caring for poultry, domestic animals and domesticated wild animals, such as cattle, sheep, dogs, buffalo, and collecting their products, such as milk, wool, and eggs. People either sell these products or the off-springs produced by them.

Migration to other countries 

According to the recent reports, many from Dharabi have shifted to Dubai and Saudi Arab in order to get jobs in Security Companies, Hotel Services, Hospitals, personal business and in the Restaurants.

References

Populated places in Chakwal District